Hooray for Love may refer to:

 Hooray for Love (film), a 1935 film starring Ann Sothern and Gene Raymond
 Hooray for Love (TV series), a 2011 Korean television drama 
 "Hooray for Love", two separate songs composed for the 1935 film Hooray for Love and the 1948 film Casbah
 Hooray for Love (TV musical)
 Hooray for Love (album), a 1960 album by New Zealand and Polynesian jazz singer Mavis Rivers